Ahmedgarh is a City and a municipal council the Indian state of Punjab. It is 18 km away from Malerkotla, the district headquarter, 25 km away from Ludhiana city.

Geography 
The city lies about 18 km north of Malerkotla on the Sangrur-Ludhiana road. It is 50 km from Sangrur, 26 km from Ludhiana, and 98 km from Chandigarh.

Transport 
It has a railway station on the Ludhiana-Jakhal railway line.

Design 
Ahmedgarh is an example of pre-independence town planning. It was planned as a market town on the model of Lyallpur (Faisalabad) in Pakistan. 

The planning consisted of a cross-axis of two main avenues along which auctioning, vending and storage of agricultural and agriculture-related goods took place. The four quadrants thus constituted the residential quarters for the people. The town was enclosed by a fasil, a brick arched wall with only four staffed entry points for security. Further, each of the four mohallas could be accessed via one of the two gated structures from the main avenues. At the intersection of the two avenues is a public well. The intersection is now known as the Gandhi chowk. The plots abutting the market avenues were 16 feet wide and ranged from 150 to 240 feet in length. Each plot was constructed with a facade featuring three Mughal arches, forming a colonnade on both sides of the avenues. Sardar Bahadur Singh Dhaliwal's descendants reside in Ahmedgharh.

At a later stage, the avenues were split in two, with shops along the median, hence forming the 8 streets intersecting at Gandhi Chowk. 

The wide avenues have been encroached upon from both sides, and only a few buildings retain the arched facade, often found behind several rooms from the entrance to the building.

Economy 

Ahmedgarh is an important agricultural market. The main crops brought to this market are paddy, wheat and cotton. Close to two industrial towns of Malerkotla and Ludhiana, a number of small-scale industries operate in and around this town. The city is also famous for agricultural implements such as diggers, plows, and sickles.

Ahmedgarh became one of India's dry ports.

Education 
Ahmedgarh has a well developed network of schools and colleges to cater to the aspirations of its residents some of whom have came here from far states in lieu of their work in industries of Ahmedgarh. Victoria Girls College, Sant Ayurvedic College, Janta College for Women are among the few reputed colleges that offer good opportunities. Both CBSE and PSEB affiliated schools are in Ahmedgarh Green Valley public schools, Victoria public school and Maya Devi Goel public school are among the good schools of Ahmedgarh whose students have been gaining success in diverse fields & bringing laurels to their schools many of them are software professionals in MNC's.

Demographics
 India census, Ahmedgarh had a population of 28,007. Males constitute 53% of the population and females 47%. Ahmedgarh has an average literacy rate of 70%, higher than the national average of 59.5%; with 56% of the males and 44% of females literate. 11% of the population is under 6.

The Ahmedgarh Municipal Council has a population of 31,302 of which 16,468 are males while 14,834 are females as per report released by Census India 2011. The population of children under 6 is 3492, 11.16% of the total. The female sex ratio is of 901 against the state average of 895. Moreover, the child sex ratio is around 841 compared to Punjab state average of 846. 

The literacy rate of Ahmedgarh City is 83.16% higher than the state average of 75.84%. population is

The Hindu  population makes up 55.89% of the total, followed by Sikhism at 29.62%, Muslims at 13.31%, Jains at .87%, Christians at .27% and Buddhists at 0.00%.

Schools in Ahmedgarh 
1.MGMN sen. sec. School Ahmedgarh
2. Green Valley Public School (Sr. Sec.), Jandali Road, Ahmedgarh, Affiliated to CBSE Delhi.
3. Anand Isher senior secondary Public school
4. Shanti Tara Collegiate School, Ahmedgarh
5. GHG Khalsa Senior secondary school
6. Maya Devi Goyel public school
7. dav sen. sec. school
8. SVM public school
9. victoria public school

Municipal Council councilor list 
Ward no 2 - Jagwinder Singh Sekha
Ward no 3 - Badhan
Ward no 5 - Jaswinder Kaur
Ward no 6 - Ubhi (Vice president)
Ward no 9 - Afridi
Ward no 10 - Jaswinder Singh sodhi
Ward no 16 - Tandon (President)
Ward no 17 - Shahi

References

Cities and towns in Malerkotla district